Old World quail is a collective name for several genera of mid-sized birds in the tribe Coturnicini of the pheasant family Phasianidae. Although all species commonly referred to as "Old World quail" are in the same tribe, they are paraphyletic with respect to the other members of the tribe, such as Alectoris, Tetraogallus, Ammoperdix, Margaroperdix, and Pternistis.

New World quail are also found in the Galliformes, but are not in the same family (Odontophoridae). Buttonquails are not closely related at all, but are named for their similar appearance. They are presently placed in the family Turnicidae of the Charadriiformes, classified as shorebirds.

The collective noun for a group of quail is flock, bevy or covey.

Taxonomy 
Old World quail may refer to the following species of Coturnicini:
Genus Synoicus
Brown quail, Synoicus ypsilophorus
Snow Mountain quail, Synoicus monorthonyx
Blue quail, Synoicus adansonii
King quail, Synoicus chinensis
Genus Coturnix
Rain quail, Coturnix coromandelica
Harlequin quail, Coturnix delegorguei
Common quail, Coturnix coturnix
†Canary Islands quail, Coturnix gomerae (fossil)
Japanese quail, Coturnix japonica
†New Zealand quail, Coturnix novaezelandiae  (extinct)
Stubble quail, Coturnix pectoralis
Genus Perdicula
Jungle bush quail, Perdicula asiatica
Rock bush quail, Perdicula argoondah
Painted bush quail, Perdicula erythrorhyncha
Manipur bush quail, Perdicula manipurensis
Genus Ophrysia
Himalayan quail, Ophrysia superciliosa  (critically endangered/extinct)

Behaviour 
Old World quail are small, plump terrestrial birds. They are seed eaters, but will also take insects and similar small prey. They nest on the ground and are capable of short, rapid bursts of flight. Some species, such as the Japanese and common quail, are migratory and fly for long distances.
 Some quail are farmed in large numbers. The common and Japanese (or coturnix) quail are both raised for table meat or to produce eggs.  They are also readily hunted, often artificially stocked on game farms or to supplement wild populations.

Migrating common quail are known to eat some poisonous seeds with no apparent ill effects but store the poison in their body fat, poisoning people who subsequently eat these birds; this condition is known as "coturnism".

References

External links 

  

Coturnicini
Quails
Bird common names